This is a list of electoral division results for the Australian 1975 federal election.

Overall
This section is an excerpt from 1975 Australian federal election § House of Representatives results

New South Wales

Banks 
This section is an excerpt from Electoral results for the Division of Banks § 1975

Barton 
This section is an excerpt from Electoral results for the Division of Barton § 1975

Bennelong 
This section is an excerpt from Electoral results for the Division of Bennelong § 1975

Berowra 
This section is an excerpt from Electoral results for the Division of Berowra § 1975

Blaxland 
This section is an excerpt from Electoral results for the Division of Blaxland § 1975

Bradfield 
This section is an excerpt from Electoral results for the Division of Bradfield § 1975

Calare 
This section is an excerpt from Electoral results for the Division of Calare § 1975

Chifley 
This section is an excerpt from Electoral results for the Division of Chifley § 1975

Cook 
This section is an excerpt from Electoral results for the Division of Cook § 1975

Cowper 
This section is an excerpt from Electoral results for the Division of Cowper § 1975

Cunningham 
This section is an excerpt from Electoral results for the Division of Cunningham § 1975

Darling 
This section is an excerpt from Electoral results for the Division of Darling § 1975

Eden-Monaro 
This section is an excerpt from Electoral results for the Division of Eden-Monaro § 1975

Evans 
This section is an excerpt from Electoral results for the Division of Evans § 1975

Farrer 
This section is an excerpt from Electoral results for the Division of Farrer § 1975

Grayndler 
This section is an excerpt from Electoral results for the Division of Grayndler § 1975

Gwydir 
This section is an excerpt from Electoral results for the Division of Gwydir § 1975

Hughes 
This section is an excerpt from Electoral results for the Division of Hughes § 1975

Hume 
This section is an excerpt from Electoral results for the Division of Hume § 1975

Hunter 
This section is an excerpt from Electoral results for the Division of Hunter § 1975

Kingsford Smith 
This section is an excerpt from Electoral results for the Division of Kingsford Smith § 1975

Lang 
This section is an excerpt from Electoral results for the Division of Lang § 1975

Lowe 
This section is an excerpt from Electoral results for the Division of Lowe § 1975

Lyne 
This section is an excerpt from Electoral results for the Division of Lyne § 1975

Macarthur 
This section is an excerpt from Electoral results for the Division of Macarthur § 1975

Mackellar 
This section is an excerpt from Electoral results for the Division of Mackellar § 1975

Macquarie 
This section is an excerpt from Electoral results for the Division of Macquarie § 1975

Mitchell 
This section is an excerpt from Electoral results for the Division of Mitchell § 1975

New England 
This section is an excerpt from Electoral results for the Division of New England § 1975

Newcastle 
This section is an excerpt from Electoral results for the Division of Newcastle1975

North Sydney 
This section is an excerpt from Electoral results for the Division of North Sydney § 1975

Parramatta 
This section is an excerpt from Electoral results for the Division of Parramatta § 1975

Paterson 
This section is an excerpt from Electoral results for the Division of Paterson § 1975

Phillip 
This section is an excerpt from Electoral results for the Division of Phillip § 1975

Prospect 
This section is an excerpt from Electoral results for the Division of Prospect § 1975

Reid
This section is an excerpt from Electoral results for the Division of Reid § 1975

Richmond 
This section is an excerpt from Electoral results for the Division of Richmond § 1975

Riverina 
This section is an excerpt from Electoral results for the Division of Riverina § 1975

Robertson 
This section is an excerpt from Electoral results for the Division of Robertson § 1975

Shortland 
This section is an excerpt from Electoral results for the Division of Shortland § 1975

St George 
This section is an excerpt from Electoral results for the Division of St George § 1975

Sydney 
This section is an excerpt from Electoral results for the Division of Sydney § 1975

Warringah 
This section is an excerpt from Electoral results for the Division of Warringah § 1975

Wentworth 
This section is an excerpt from Electoral results for the Division of Wentworth § 1975

Werriwa 
This section is an excerpt from Electoral results for the Division of Werriwa § 1975

Victoria

Balaclava 
This section is an excerpt from Electoral results for the Division of Balaclava § 1975

Ballaarat 
This section is an excerpt from Electoral results for the Division of Ballarat § 1975

Batman 
This section is an excerpt from Electoral results for the Division of Batman § 1975

Bendigo 
This section is an excerpt from Electoral results for the Division of Bendigo § 1975

Bruce 
This section is an excerpt from Electoral results for the Division of Bruce § 1975

Burke 
This section is an excerpt from Electoral results for the Division of Burke (1969–2004) § 1975

Casey 
This section is an excerpt from Electoral results for the Division of Casey § 1975

Chisholm 
This section is an excerpt from Electoral results for the Division of Chisholm § 1975

Corangamite 
This section is an excerpt from Electoral results for the Division of Corangamite § 1975

Corio 
This section is an excerpt from Electoral results for the Division of Corio § 1975

Deakin 
This section is an excerpt from Electoral results for the Division of Deakin § 1975

Diamond Valley 
This section is an excerpt from Electoral results for the Division of Diamond Valley § 1975

Flinders 
This section is an excerpt from Electoral results for the Division of Flinders § 1975

Gellibrand 
This section is an excerpt from Electoral results for the Division of Gellibrand § 1975

Gippsland 
This section is an excerpt from Electoral results for the Division of Gippsland § 1975

Henty 
This section is an excerpt from Electoral results for the Division of Henty § 1975

Higgins 
This section is an excerpt from Electoral results for the Division of Higgins § 1975

Holt 
This section is an excerpt from Electoral results for the Division of Holt § 1975

Hotham 
This section is an excerpt from Electoral results for the Division of Hotham § 1975

Indi 
This section is an excerpt from Electoral results for the Division of Indi § 1975

Isaacs 
This section is an excerpt from Electoral results for the Division of Isaacs § 1975

Kooyong 
This section is an excerpt from Electoral results for the Division of Kooyong § 1975

La Trobe 
This section is an excerpt from Electoral results for the Division of La Trobe § 1975

Lalor 
This section is an excerpt from Electoral results for the Division of Lalor § 1975

Mallee 
This section is an excerpt from Electoral results for the Division of Mallee § 1975

Maribyrnong 
This section is an excerpt from Electoral results for the Division of Maribyrnong § 1975

McMillan 
This section is an excerpt from Electoral results for the Division of McMillan § 1975

Melbourne 
This section is an excerpt from Electoral results for the Division of Melbourne § 1975

Melbourne Ports 
This section is an excerpt from Electoral results for the Division of Melbourne Ports § 1975

Murray 
This section is an excerpt from Electoral results for the Division of Murray § 1975

Scullin 
This section is an excerpt from Electoral results for the Division of Scullin § 1975

Wannon 
This section is an excerpt from Electoral results for the Division of Wannon § 1975

Wills 
This section is an excerpt from Electoral results for the Division of Wills § 1975

Wimmera 
This section is an excerpt from Electoral results for the Division of Wimmera § 1975

Queensland

Bowman 
This section is an excerpt from Electoral results for the Division of Bowman § 1975

Brisbane 
This section is an excerpt from Electoral results for the Division of Brisbane § 1975

Capricornia 
This section is an excerpt from Electoral results for the Division of Capricornia § 1975

Darling Downs 
This section is an excerpt from Electoral results for the Division of Darling Downs § 1975

Dawson 
This section is an excerpt from Electoral results for the Division of Dawson § 1975

Fisher 
This section is an excerpt from Electoral results for the Division of Fisher § 1975

Griffith 
This section is an excerpt from Electoral results for the Division of Griffith § 1975

Herbert 
This section is an excerpt from Electoral results for the Division of Herbert § 1975

Kennedy 
This section is an excerpt from Electoral results for the Division of Kennedy § 1975

Leichhardt 
This section is an excerpt from Electoral results for the Division of Leichhardt § 1975

Lilley 
This section is an excerpt from Electoral results for the Division of Lilley § 1975

Maranoa 
This section is an excerpt from Electoral results for the Division of Maranoa § 1975

McPherson 
This section is an excerpt from Electoral results for the Division of McPherson § 1975

Moreton 
This section is an excerpt from Electoral results for the Division of Moreton § 1975

Oxley 
This section is an excerpt from Electoral results for the Division of Oxley § 1975

Petrie 
This section is an excerpt from Electoral results for the Division of Petrie § 1975

Ryan 
This section is an excerpt from Electoral results for the Division of Ryan § 1975

Wide Bay 
This section is an excerpt from Electoral results for the Division of Wide Bay § 1975

South Australia

Adelaide 
This section is an excerpt from Electoral results for the Division of Adelaide § 1975

Angas 
This section is an excerpt from Electoral results for the Division of Angas (1949–1977) § 1949

Barker 
This section is an excerpt from Electoral results for the Division of Barker § 1975

Bonython 
This section is an excerpt from Electoral results for the Division of Bonython § 1975

Boothby 
This section is an excerpt from Electoral results for the Division of Boothby § 1975

Grey 
This section is an excerpt from Electoral results for the Division of Grey § 1975

Hawker 
This section is an excerpt from Electoral results for the Division of Hawker § 1975

Hindmarsh 
This section is an excerpt from Electoral results for the Division of Hindmarsh § 1975

Kingston 
This section is an excerpt from Electoral results for the Division of Kingston § 1975

Port Adelaide 
This section is an excerpt from Electoral results for the Division of Port Adelaide § 1975

Sturt 
This section is an excerpt from Electoral results for the Division of Sturt § 1975

Wakefield 
This section is an excerpt from Electoral results for the Division of Wakefield § 1975

Western Australia

Canning 
This section is an excerpt from Electoral results for the Division of Canning § 1975

Curtin 
This section is an excerpt from Electoral results for the Division of Curtin § 1975

Forrest 
This section is an excerpt from Electoral results for the Division of Forrest § 1975

Fremantle 
This section is an excerpt from Electoral results for the Division of Fremantle § 1975

Kalgoorlie 
This section is an excerpt from Electoral results for the Division of Kalgoorlie § 1975

Moore 
This section is an excerpt from Electoral results for the Division of Moore § 1975

Perth 
This section is an excerpt from Electoral results for the Division of Perth § 1975

Stirling 
This section is an excerpt from Electoral results for the Division of Stirling § 1975

Swan 
This section is an excerpt from Electoral results for the Division of Swan § 1975

Tangney 
This section is an excerpt from Electoral results for the Division of Tangney § 1975

Tasmania

Bass 
This section is an excerpt from Electoral results for the Division of Bass § 1975

Braddon 
This section is an excerpt from Electoral results for the Division of Braddon § 1975

Denison 
This section is an excerpt from Electoral results for the Division of Denison § 1975

Franklin 
This section is an excerpt from Electoral results for the Division of Franklin § 1975

Wilmot 
This section is an excerpt from Electoral results for the Division of Wilmot § 1975

Australian Capital Territory

Canberra 
This section is an excerpt from Electoral results for the Division of Canberra § 1975

Fraser 
This section is an excerpt from Electoral results for the Division of Fraser (Australian Capital Territory) § 1975

Northern Territory 

This section is an excerpt from Electoral results for the Division of Northern Territory § 1975

See also 
 Candidates of the 1975 Australian federal election
 Members of the Australian House of Representatives, 1975–1977

References 

House of Representatives 1975